The Women's 200 metre backstroke competition of the 2014 FINA World Swimming Championships (25 m) was held on 5 December.

Records
Prior to the competition, the existing world and championship records were as follows.

The following records were established during the competition:

Results

Heats
The heats were held at 10:01.

Final
The final were held at 18:32.

References

Women's 200 metre backstroke
2014 in women's swimming